Sedan is an unincorporated community in Richland Township, DeKalb County, Indiana.

History
Originally named Lawrence, the town's post office was first established in 1854 and referred to as Iba (or Ida). Renamed Sedan P.O. in 1861, the post office was subsequently discontinued in 1908. The community was likely named after Sedan, in France.

Geography

Demographics

Sedan appeared as a separately-returned community in the 1870 Census, when it was reported to have a population of 176.

References

Unincorporated communities in DeKalb County, Indiana
Unincorporated communities in Indiana